The following radio stations broadcast on AM frequency 580 kHz: 580 AM is classified as a regional broadcast frequency by the Federal Communications Commission.

Argentina 
 Andina in San Rafael, Mendoza
 LU20 in Trelew, Chubut
 LV15 in Villa Mercedes, San Luis
 LW1 in Córdoba, Córdoba.

Bolivia 
 CP 91 in La Paz

Brazil 
 ZYJ-330 in Santa Helena, Paraná
 ZYJ-465 in Rio de Janeiro
 ZYH-290 in Tefé
 ZYH-477 in Alcobaça, Bahia
 ZYI-387 in Campo Grande
 ZYI-776 in Recife
 ZYK-299 in São Gabriel
 ZYK-318 in Vacaria
 ZYK-540 in Americana, São Paulo state
 ZYK-724 in Palmital
 ZYK780 in Porto Nacional
 ZYL-328 in Uberlandia

Canada

Chile 
 CB-058 in Easter Island.

Colombia 
 HJHP in Jamundí

Cuba 
 CMAA in Pinar del Río
 CMMF in Baracoa

Ecuador 
 HCPC2 in Guayaquil

Guatemala 
 TGY in Pucá

Honduras 
 HRZQ in Tegucigalpa

Jamaica 
 RJR in Galina

Mexico 
 XEAV-AM in Guadalajara, Jalisco
 XEFI-AM in Chihuahua, Chihuahua
 XEYI-AM in Cancún, Quintana Roo
 XELRDA-AM in Piedras Negras, Coahuila

Panama 
 HOH 4 in Chiriqui

Paraguay 
 ZP61 in Pilar, Paraguay

Peru 
 OAX2E in Jaén, San Ignacio, Peru

United States

Uruguay 
 CX58 in Montevideo

Venezuela 
 YVMJ in Maracaibo

External links

 FCC list of radio stations on 580 kHz

References

Lists of radio stations by frequency